Hisashi Hieda (born December 31, 1937) is a Japanese television executive who is the chief executive officer at Fuji Media Holdings, Inc, and chairman since June 2001. He also is chairman of the Japan Art Association.

Biography 
Hieda, who introduced the slogan “If it’s not fun, it’s not Fuji TV,” joined the broadcaster in 1961 and became president and CEO in 1988. He has held the post of chairman and CEO of Fujisankei Communications International since 1992.

During his tenure, programs were introduced that catapulted Fuji from fourth to first place in the ratings and which have turned it into Japan’s most profitable network. Hieda has also been involved in the company’s successful moviemaking activities.

References

External links 
 Hisashi Hieda Biography at Reuters

1937 births
Living people
Japanese chief executives
Chief executives in the media industry
International Emmy Founders Award winners
Honorary Knights Commander of the Order of the British Empire